The name Ileana has been used for five tropical cyclones in the Eastern Pacific Ocean. The name replaced Iva, which was retired after the 1988 season.
 Hurricane Ileana (1994) – a Category 1 hurricane that affected the Baja California Peninsula.
 Tropical Storm Ileana (2000) – affected the coast of Mexico.
 Hurricane Ileana (2006) – a Category 3 hurricane that briefly threatened Mexico but turned away.  
 Hurricane Ileana (2012) – a Category 1 hurricane that did not affect land.
 Tropical Storm Ileana (2018) – briefly affected the coast of Mexico, before being absorbed by Hurricane John.

Pacific hurricane set index articles